The Canadian Screen Award for Best Achievement in Editing is awarded by the Academy of Canadian Cinema and Television to the best Canadian film editor in a feature film. The award was presented for the first time in 1966 as part of the Canadian Film Awards, and was transitioned to the new Genie Awards in 1980. Since 2012 it has been presented as part of the Canadian Screen Awards.

Beginning with the 3rd Canadian Screen Awards, a separate category was introduced for Best Editing in a Documentary.

1960s

1970s

1980s

1990s

2000s

2010s

2020s

See also
Prix Iris for Best Editing

References

Film editing awards
 
Editing